Charter for the Rights, Freedoms, and Privileges of the Noble Russian Gentry also called  Charter to the Gentry  or Charter to the Nobility was a charter issued in 1785 by the Russian empress Catherine II.

It recognized the corps of nobles in each province as a legal corporate body and stated the rights and privileges bestowed upon its members. The charter was divided into an introduction and four sections:
 Personal rights and privileges of the gentry.
 Corporate self-organization of the gentry. Assemblies of Nobility
 Genealogy books.
 Documents, establishing nobility.

Notable rights given to the Gentry via the charter include being exempt from taxation, controlling the economic gains of their serfs, being exempt from corporal punishment, allowing them the right to assembly, and allowing them to be tried in their own courts.

External links
 Articles from Catherine's Charter of the Nobility

Law in the Russian Empire
1785 documents